Leandro Spadacio Leite (born 17 February 2000) is a Brazilian footballer who currently plays for Ittihad Kalba on loan from Shabab Al Ahli.

Career statistics

Club

Notes

References

External links

2000 births
Living people
Brazilian footballers
Brazilian expatriate footballers
Association football midfielders
UAE Pro League players
Fluminense FC players
Shabab Al-Ahli Club players
Ajman Club players
Al-Ittihad Kalba SC players
Expatriate footballers in the United Arab Emirates
Brazilian expatriate sportspeople in the United Arab Emirates